Kutai zone refers to the homeland of the Kutainese in East Kalimantan, Indonesia. There are three regencies which is Kutai Kartanegara Regency, East Kutai Regency, West Kutai Regency.

Kutai Kartanegara Regency
East Kutai Regency
West Kutai Regency